The Trans Austria Gas (TAG) pipeline is a natural gas pipeline that leads from the Slovak-Austrian border at Baumgarten an der March to Arnoldstein in the south, near the border with Italy. Natural gas originating from Russia is transported to and used in Italy and Austria. In addition, it supplies Slovenia through the SOL Pipeline System (Süd - Ost - Leitung), which branch-off at Weitendorf.

Technical features
The original two lines date back to the 1960s, but in 2006 the pipeline was extended by adding the third line. The extension cost US$157 million.

The capacity of the pipeline is 41 billion cubic meters (bcm) of natural gas annually. The construction of two additional compression stations increased the capacity to 47.5 bcm  at end 2008.

Pipeline company
The pipeline is managed by Trans Austria Gasleitung GmbH (TAG GmbH), a partnership of Eni and OMV. Eni owns 89% of TAG and manages the pipeline, with OMV holding the remainder.

Antitrust case
Since 2007, the European Commission has been probing Eni's alleged restrictive practices on the TAG, Transitgas and TENP pipelines by limiting third parties access to the pipelines.  The hearing is set for 27 November 2007.  To end the case, Eni is studying the possible sale of the pipeline.

References

External links

 Company website

Natural gas pipelines in Austria
Eni